The election for the President of the Senate of the Republic who would serve through the legislature XVIII of Italy took place on 23 and 24 March 2022, over three weeks after the 2018 Italian general election. It took place by secret ballot, as required by the assembly's standing orders. Former President of Italy Giorgio Napolitano, being the oldest Senator present, served as the acting presiding officer.

Following an agreement between the centre-right coalition and the Five Star Movement, Maria Elisabetta Alberti Casellati became the first woman to be elected to the office.

Procedure 
The election takes place by secret ballot, as required by the assembly's standing orders. Pursuant to the current rules of procedure, an absolute majority of the whole membership is needed to win on the first ballot. On the second and third ballot, a simple majority of votes cast (including blank ballots among the totals) suffices. If the first three ballots fail to deliver a winner, a runoff is held between the two candidates who got the most votes on the third ballot, with votes for any other candidate deemed invalid and blank ballots not included among the totals. In the event of a tie, the most senior of the two candidates is elected.

Results

First ballot

Second ballot

Third ballot

See also 
2018 President of the Italian Chamber of Deputies election

Notes

References 

2018 elections in Italy
March 2018 events in Italy
President of the Italian Senate elections